Anthony David Weiner (born September 4, 1964) is an American former politician who served as the U.S. representative for  from 1999 until his resignation in 2011. A member of the Democratic Party, he consistently carried the district with at least 60% of the vote. Weiner resigned from Congress in June 2011 after it was revealed he sent sexually suggestive photos of himself to different women.

A two-time candidate for Mayor of New York City, Wiener finished second in the Democratic primary in 2005. He ran again in 2013, placing fifth in the Democratic primary.

In 2017, Weiner pleaded guilty to transferring obscene material to a minor and was sentenced to 21 months in prison. He was also required to permanently register as a sex offender. Weiner began serving his federal prison sentence the same year and was released in 2019.

Early life 
Weiner was born in the New York City borough of Brooklyn, the middle son of Jewish parents, Mort Weiner, a lawyer, and his wife, Frances (née Finkelstein), a public high school math teacher. The family lived for a time in the Park Slope neighborhood of Brooklyn. Weiner attended elementary school at P.S. 39 The Henry Bristow School. His older brother Seth was 39 years old when he was killed by a hit-and-run driver in 2000. His younger brother, Jason, is a chef and co-owner of several New York restaurants.

Weiner took the Specialized High Schools Admissions Test, an examination used to determine admission to all but one of New York City's specialized high schools, and was admitted to Brooklyn Technical High School, from which he graduated in 1981. He  attended the State University of New York at Plattsburgh, and spent his junior year as an exchange student at the College of William & Mary, where he was friends with future comic and political commentator Jon Stewart. Stewart acknowledged the friendship when he poked fun at him during the sexting scandal in 2011. Weiner's interests turned towards politics; he became active in student government and was named most effective student senator.

After he received his Bachelor of Arts degree in political science in 1985, Weiner joined the staff of then–United States Representative and current Senator Charles Schumer. He worked in Schumer's Washington, D.C. office for three years, then transferred to the district office in Brooklyn in 1988, when Schumer encouraged him to become involved in local politics.

New York City Council 
After working for Schumer for six years, Weiner got his first chance at political office in 1991 when the New York City Council was expanded from 35 to 51 seats. Weiner was considered a long-shot because he faced strong competition in the Democratic primary elections from two other candidates who had better local name recognition and funding. Weiner narrowly won the primary, besting Adele Cohen by fewer than 200 votes. Controversy ensued in the last weeks of the campaign after Weiner's campaign anonymously spread leaflets around the district that had alleged ties between Cohen and the so-called "Jackson-Dinkins agenda"; the leaflets referred to the Crown Heights riots earlier in the year, after which white residents had seen Jesse Jackson, who became notorious for his earlier remarks about New York City as "Hymietown", and then-mayor David Dinkins as having been beholden to the predominantly African-American rioters and therefore endangering whites.

Weiner's win in the November general election was widely considered a formality because he had no opposition in the heavily Democratic district. He was 27 years old when he became the youngest councilman in the city's history. Over the next seven years on the City Council, Weiner initiated programs to address quality of life concerns. He also started a program to put at-risk and troubled teens to work cleaning up graffiti, and he backed development plans that helped revive the historic Sheepshead Bay area.

U.S. House of Representatives

Elections 
In 1998, Weiner ran for Congress from New York's 9th congressional district, which was the seat held by his mentor, Chuck Schumer, who had run successfully for the U.S. Senate. Weiner won the Democratic primary election, which was tantamount to election in the heavily Democratic district that included parts of southern Brooklyn and south and central Queens.

Domestic issues 

Weiner received a 100% rating from the NARAL Pro-Choice America in 2003 and a 0% rating from National Right to Life Committee 2006, which indicated a strong pro-choice voting record. He was critical of the 2009 Stupak-Pitts Amendment to the Affordable Care Act, which prohibits the use of taxpayer funds for abortions, calling it "unnecessary and divisive" and saying it would prevent health insurers from offering abortion coverage regardless of whether an individual uses federal funds to purchase an insurance plan.

In April 2008, Weiner created the bi-partisan Congressional Middle Class Caucus. He received an "A" on the Drum Major Institute's 2005 Congressional Scorecard on middle-class issues. In June 2008, Weiner sponsored a bill to increase the number of O-visas available to foreign fashion models, arguing that it would help boost the fashion industry in New York City. He criticized UN diplomats for failing to pay parking tickets in New York City, claiming foreign nations owed $18,000,000 to the city.

During the health care reform debates of 2009, Weiner advocated for a bill called the United States National Health Care Act, which would have expanded Medicare to all Americans, regardless of age. He remarked that while 4% of Medicare funds go to overhead, private insurers put 30% of their customer's money into profits and overhead instead of into health care. In late July 2009, he secured a full House floor vote for single payer health care in exchange for not amending America's Affordable Health Choices Act of 2009 in committee mark-up with a single-payer plan.

When a public health insurance option was being considered as part of America's Affordable Health Choices Act of 2009, Weiner said that it would help reduce costs, and he set up a website to push for the option. He attracted widespread attention when described the Republican Party as "a wholly owned subsidiary of the insurance industry, teaming up with a small group of Democrats to try to protect that industry". In February 2010, he proclaimed in front of Congress that "every single Republican I have ever met in my entire life is a wholly owned subsidiary of the insurance industry."

Weiner was the chief sponsor of the Prevent All Cigarette Trafficking Act of 2009, which made the selling of tobacco in violation of any state tax law a federal crime, and effectively ended Internet tobacco smuggling by stopping shipments of cigarettes through the United States Postal Service. He claimed, "This new law will give states and localities a major revenue boost by cracking down on the illegal sale of tobacco", and added that "Every day we delay is another day that New York loses significant amounts of tax revenue and kids have easy access to tobacco products sold over the Internet."

On July 29, 2010, Weiner criticized Republicans for opposing the 9/11 Health and Compensation Act, which would provide for funds for sick first responders to the 9/11 attacks on the World Trade Center. In a speech on the floor of the House, he accused Republicans of hiding behind procedural questions as an excuse to vote against the bill.

In response to pressure from Weiner, YouTube removed some of Anwar al-Awlaki's inflammatory videos from its website in November 2010. Weiner voted against the Tax Relief, Unemployment Insurance Reauthorization, and Job Creation Act of 2010. As a prominent Democratic opponent of the tax cut package passed by Congress, Weiner said Republicans had gotten the better of President Barack Obama in the negotiations to reach an agreement on the $858 billion deal and said the Republicans turned out to be "better poker players" than Obama.

In 2002 Weiner voiced strong criticism of the removal of the World Trade Center debris without investigating it for determining the causes of the collapses of Tower 1, 2 and 7.

Foreign policy 
In 2002, Weiner voted to give President George W. Bush the authority to use military force against Iraq. In May 2006, Weiner attempted to bar the Palestinian delegation from entering the United Nations. He added that the delegation "should start packing their little Palestinian terrorist bags", and went on to claim that Human Rights Watch, The New York Times, and Amnesty International are all biased against Israel.

On July 29, 2007, Weiner and Rep. Jerrold Nadler (D-N.Y.) objected to a $20-billion arms deal that the Bush Administration had negotiated with Saudi Arabia because they didn't want to provide "sophisticated weapons to a country that they believe has not done enough to stop terrorism", noting that 15 of the 19 hijackers of September 11, 2001, were Saudis. Weiner made the announcement outside of the Saudi Arabian consulate in Washington, stating, "We need to send a crystal clear message to the Saudi Arabian government that their tacit approval of terrorism can't go unpunished." The two intended to use a provision of the Arms Export Control Act to review the deal and pass a Joint Resolution of Disapproval.

Weiner and several other members of Congress later criticized the Obama administration's proposal to sell over $60 billion in arms to Saudi Arabia. He said: "Saudi Arabia is not deserving of our aid, and by arming them with advanced American weaponry we are sending the wrong message", and described Saudi Arabia as having a "history of financing terrorism" and teaching "hatred of Christians and Jews" to its schoolchildren.

Management style 
In July 2008, The New York Times characterized Weiner as one of the most intense and demanding of bosses. The newspaper described him as a person who often worked long hours with his staff and required them to be in constant contact via BlackBerry. He frequently yelled at them and occasionally threw office furniture in anger. As a result of Weiner's actions, the Times reported that he had one of the highest staff turnover rates of any member of Congress; this included the departure of three chiefs of staff within an 18-month period. Weiner admitted he pushed his aides hard but said that his speaking at a high decibel level was part of his background and style, not necessarily shouting. Though some former employees were critical of his supervisory practices, others praised him for his intense involvement in constituent concerns and readiness to fight for New York City.

Traffic tickets 
A 2010 license plate check by the Capitol Hill newspaper Roll Call showed that Weiner's vehicles were among several owned by members of Congress that had unpaid tickets. Weiner's past due fines, which spanned three years and totaled more than $2,000, were among the highest uncovered by Roll Call and were paid in full shortly after publication of the article. On June 13, 2011, the New York Daily News reported that one of Weiner's vehicles, though it had been issued valid plates, was displaying expired plates that had been issued to another one of his vehicles.

Sexting scandals, prosecution, and guilty plea 

On May 27, 2011, Weiner used his public Twitter account to send a link to a woman who was following him on Twitter. The link contained a sexually explicit photograph of himself. After several days of denying that he had posted the image, Weiner held a press conference at which he admitted he had "exchanged messages and photos of an explicit nature with about six women over the last three years" and apologized for his earlier denials. After an explicit photo was leaked through the Twitter account of a listener of The Opie & Anthony Show, Weiner announced on June 16, 2011, that he would resign from Congress, and he formally did so on June 21. A special election was held on September 13, 2011, to replace him; Republican businessman Bob Turner defeated Democrat David Weprin to fill Weiner's seat.

A second sexting scandal began on July 23, 2013, which was several months after Weiner returned to politics in the New York City mayoral race. Weiner sent explicit photos under the alias "Carlos Danger" to a 22-year-old woman with whom he had contact as late as April 2013, which was more than a year after he had left Congress. The woman was later identified as Sydney Leathers. She was an Indiana native who first came into contact with him when she expressed her disapproval of his extramarital behaviors.

On August 28, 2016, the New York Post reported that Weiner had sexted another woman, including sending a picture while he was lying in bed with his young son. The New York Times reported the next day that Weiner and his wife Huma Abedin intended to separate. Abedin announced her intention by stating, "After long and painful consideration and work on my marriage, I have made the decision to separate from my husband. Anthony and I remain devoted to doing what is best for our son, who is the light of our life. During this difficult time, I ask for respect for our privacy."

In September 2016, claims were published that Weiner had engaged in sexting with a 15-year-old girl from North Carolina, and devices owned by Weiner were seized as part of an investigation into this incident. The report prompted a criminal investigation and Weiner's laptop was seized. Emails that were pertinent to the Hillary Clinton email controversy were discovered on the laptop; this prompted FBI Director James Comey to reopen that investigation eleven days before the 2016 US presidential election. Hillary Clinton said Comey's decision was one of the reasons she lost the election to Donald Trump.

On January 31, 2017, The Wall Street Journal reported that federal prosecutors were weighing whether or not to bring child pornography charges against Weiner over the incident. On May 19, 2017, The New York Times reported in its online edition that Weiner had surrendered to the FBI that morning. Under a plea agreement, he intended to plead guilty to a single charge of transferring obscene material to a minor. Under the agreement, Weiner faced a sentence of 21 to 27 months in federal prison and would be required to register as a sex offender. At his sentencing hearing on September 25, 2017, presiding judge Denise Cote sentenced Weiner to 21 months in prison, beginning on November 6, 2017. with an additional three years of supervision following his prison term.

On November 6, 2017, Weiner reported to Federal Medical Center, Devens in Ayer, Massachusetts to begin his 21-month sentence. After getting about three months deducted from his sentence for good behavior, Weiner was released from prison on February 17, 2019, and sent to a halfway house in Brooklyn, New York. Weiner was released from a Bronx halfway house on May 14, 2019. Weiner will have to register as a sex offender for the rest of his life.

New York mayoral elections

2005 
Weiner sought the Democratic nomination to run for New York City mayor in 2005, vying against three other candidates. He had a three-part pitch to voters that included criticizing sitting Mayor Michael Bloomberg for his top-down style of management and promising a more democratic approach; against "passivity in City Hall" and for getting more federal money for the city; and a series of ideas on how to get the city to work better. He presented a book of 50 "Real Solutions" and among his policy proposals were fixes for the health care and educational systems. One idea already in play was a neighborhood scrubbing-up program he dubbed "Weiner's Cleaners".

Weiner started out last in many polls, but gained ground in the final weeks of the campaign, coming in second. Initial election returns had Fernando Ferrer with 39.95% of the vote, just shy of the 40% required to avoid a runoff against Weiner, who had 28.82%, but Weiner conceded, citing the need for party unity and denying rumors that various high-ranking New York Democrats, such as Senator Chuck Schumer and New York Attorney General Eliot Spitzer, had urged him to concede. Absentee ballots put Ferrer over the 40% mark in the official primary election returns.

2009 
Weiner appeared to be a candidate for mayor again in 2009. However, in May 2009, after the New York City Council voted to extend term limits for Mayor Bloomberg, Weiner announced his decision not to run against the popular incumbent. By July 2010, Weiner had raised $3.9 million for a potential campaign in the 2013 mayoral election, and was considered a leading contender in early polls. According to the New York City Campaign Finance Board website, as of the March 2013 filing deadline Weiner had raised over $5.1 million, the second most among registered mayoral candidates, behind only Christine Quinn.

2013 
In an interview with The New York Times Magazine published online on April 10, 2013, Weiner said he would like to "ask people to give me a second chance" and was considering a run for mayor. He added that, "it's now or maybe never for me."

In an interview on April 11, Rep. Keith Ellison endorsed Weiner, saying that he would love to see him become mayor of New York. Weiner announced his intent to seek candidacy on a YouTube video on May 21, 2013.

Weiner's platform for candidacy was summarized in "Keys to the City: 64 Ideas to Keep New York City the Capital of the Middle Class".

After his resignation from Congress, Weiner used the alias "Carlos Danger" to continue to send explicit photographs.  Following the second set of sexting allegations, he acknowledged on July 23, 2013, that he had sent messages to at least three women in 2012. One recipient stated that Weiner described himself to her as “an argumentative, perpetually horny middle-aged man”. Following this admission, there were calls for Weiner to drop out of the mayoral race; however, Weiner held a press conference with his wife, Huma Abedin, in which he announced that he would continue his campaign. At the press conference, Weiner said, "I said that other texts and photos were likely to come out and today they have... I want to again say that I am very sorry to anyone who was on the receiving end of these messages and the disruption this has caused.”

On July 27, 2013, Danny Kedem, Weiner's campaign chief, announced his resignation. On September 10, 2013, Weiner lost the mayoral primary, winning only 4.9% of the vote.

Post-congressional private sector work 
In July 2011 (which was less than a month after he left Congress), Weiner created the consulting firm Woolf-Weiner Associates. He advised over a dozen companies that included electronic medical records providers and biofuel firms. He worked with Covington & Burling, an international law firm. According to 2012 public disclosures, his work helped increase his combined family income to $496,000. Weiner argued that despite contacting members of Congress on behalf of his clients, his work did not meet the legal definition of lobbying. This was based on the so-called "Daschle Loophole" in the Lobbying Disclosure Act, which requires only those who spend more than 20% of their time lobbying to register as lobbyists.

Some people on both the political left and right criticized Weiner for his consulting work. During an interview on MSNBC, Lawrence O'Donnell criticized Weiner stating, "You went out to make money as a lobbyist... you did the classic hack thing and you know it."  Weiner maintained he was not a lobbyist.

The Sunlight Foundation also criticized Weiner for stealth lobbying and falling under the aforementioned "Daschle Loophole". The public never learned of his lobbying work until two years later, when his nondisclosure agreements expired.

In July 2015, Weiner was hired by MWW Group, a PR firm in New York City as a part-time consultant to serve on the company's board of advisors.

By September 2015, his employment at MWW had ended, with the firm's head Michael Kempner stating "It has become clear that a handful of people and a few media outlets continue to be fixated on Anthony". According to Politico New York, Weiner reportedly first learned of Kempner's decision through a mass email.

On August 29, 2016, the New York Daily News said it would no longer carry Weiner's columns, which included his writings on New York City politics. On the same day, television channel NY1 said Weiner would not be reprising his contributor role on any of its shows.

Weiner served as CEO of IceStone, a Brooklyn-based kitchen-countertop company. He  left his role as CEO in August 2021, as the company transitions to becoming a worker-owned cooperative.

After leaving IceStone, he began working for WABC radio where he co-hosts a weekly live show with Curtis Sliwa and records a weekly podcast.

Personal life 

Weiner is Jewish. He is a lifelong fan of the New York Mets and New York Islanders.

In 2009, he became engaged to Huma Abedin, a long-time personal aide to Hillary Clinton, and they married in July 2010, with former president Bill Clinton officiating. Abedin is a practicing Muslim of Indian and Pakistani descent. In December 2011, Abedin gave birth to a son.

In August 2016, Abedin announced that she was separating from Weiner. In early 2017, Abedin announced her intent to file for divorce with sole physical custody of their son.  On May 19, 2017, after he pleaded guilty, she filed for divorce. Abedin and Weiner withdrew their divorce case from court in January 2018, saying they decided to settle the divorce privately in order to spare their six-year-old son further embarrassment. As of November 2021, their divorce is in its final stages, although they still see each other and raise their son.

In popular culture 
In 2013, Weiner and Abedin allowed filmmakers full access to his mayoral campaign. In 2016, the resulting documentary, Weiner, premiered at the Sundance Film Festival.

In 2013, a production called The Weiner Monologues premiered at the Access Theater. Directed by Jonathan Harper Schlieman, the show was based on media coverage of Weiner's sexting scandal.

In 2014, he had a cameo appearance in an Alpha House episode.

Weiner appeared in the Syfy movie Sharknado 3: Oh Hell No! (2015), portraying the Director of NASA.

See also 
 List of American federal politicians convicted of crimes
 List of federal political scandals in the United States
 List of federal political sex scandals in the United States
 List of Jewish members of the United States Congress

References

External links 

 Berman, Daphna, "Live from New York, It's Anthony Weiner", Moment Magazine (May/June 2011)
 Video of Weiner's June 6, 2011 Press conference (CBS News), with transcript (New York Post), June 6, 2011
 Ask Anthony Weiner on YouTube
 

|-

|-

 
1964 births
20th-century American politicians
21st-century American criminals
21st-century American politicians
21st-century American Jews
American people convicted of child sexual abuse
American politicians convicted of sex offences
Brooklyn Technical High School alumni
Democratic Party members of the United States House of Representatives from New York (state)
Jewish members of the United States House of Representatives
Living people
New York City Council members
New York (state) politicians convicted of crimes
People from Park Slope
Prisoners and detainees of the United States federal government
Public officeholders of Rockaway, Queens
State University of New York at Plattsburgh alumni